Luke Robinson (born 6 August 1990), better known as Luke Blackledge, is an English professional boxer. He held the Commonwealth super-middleweight title from 2015 to 2016 and challenged once for the British super-middleweight title in 2016. Upon turning professional, he changed his name from Robinson to Blackledge in order to avoid confusion with another English boxer of the same name.

Professional boxing record

References

External links

Image - Luke Blackledge

1990 births
English male boxers
Living people
People from Clitheroe
People from Accrington
Super-middleweight boxers
Light-heavyweight boxers